Elections in India in 2022 include election to the office of the President of India, vice president of India, by-elections to the Lok Sabha, elections to the Rajya Sabha, elections to state legislative assemblies of 7 (seven) states, by-elections to state legislative assemblies and numerous other elections and by-elections to state legislative councils and local bodies.

Presidential election 

Presidential election was held on 18 July 2022. The counting of votes took place on 21 July 2022 and Droupadi Murmu was elected as the next President of India.

Vice presidential election 

Vice presidential election was held on 6 August 2022. The votes were counted on the same day and Jagdeep Dhankhar was elected as the next Vice president of India.

Lok Sabha by-elections

State legislative assembly elections

Legislative Assembly by-elections

Andhra Pradesh

Assam

Bihar

Chhattisgarh

Delhi

Jharkhand

Haryana

Kerala

Maharashtra

Odisha

Rajasthan

Telangana

Tripura

Uttar Pradesh

Uttarakhand

West Bengal

Local body elections

Assam

Delhi

Karnataka

Madhya Pradesh

Mizoram

Odisha

Tamil Nadu

West Bengal

See also 
 2021 elections in India
 2023 elections in India
 2022 Indian Rajya Sabha elections

References

External links 
Election Commission of India (official website)

 
India
2022 in India
Elections in India by year